Queen Elizabeth was launched in 1811 at Pownall Bay, Prince Edward Island. She sailed to England and transferred her registry to the Port of Exeter on 20 April 1812. She then traded between England and Canada, was a transport, and traded between London and the Cape of Good Hope.

Queen Elizabeth first appeared in Lloyd's Register (LR) in 1812.

She arrived at Plymouth on 11 October 1812 with a cargo of timber from Prince Edward Island.

Notes

Citations

References
 

1811 ships
Ships built in Prince Edward Island
Age of Sail merchant ships of England